Domaszków  is a village in the administrative district of Gmina Wołów, within Wołów County, Lower Silesian Voivodeship, in south-western Poland.

The village has an approximate population of 280.

References

Domaszkow